The 2011–2012 figure skating season began on July 1, 2011, and ends on June 30, 2012. Figure skaters use music in competition.

Skaters in the four disciplines of men's singles, ladies' singles, pair skating and ice dancing used the following music in their 2011–2012 competitive programs.

Men

Ladies

Pairs

Ice dancing
In alphabetical order according to lady's surname.

References

Music
Music
Figure skating-related lists